The Mark 11 torpedo was the first American torpedo to be designed within the United States Navy without collaboration from industry. It was developed by the Washington Navy Yard in Washington, D.C. and the Naval Torpedo Station in Newport, Rhode Island. The Mark 11 torpedo was also the first to feature a three-speed setting capability while tube-loaded: high at 46 knots, medium at 34 knots and low at 27 knots.  Due to stability problems it was supplemented by the Mark 12 torpedo within two years, which had a 44-knot high speed setting.

See also
American 21 inch torpedo

References 

Torpedoes of the United States
World War II naval weapons